

Overview

England vs New Zealand

Pakistan vs Sri Lanka

England vs Sri Lanka

New Zealand vs Pakistan

England vs Pakistan

New Zealand vs Sri Lanka

England vs New Zealand

Pakistan vs Sri Lanka

England vs Pakistan

New Zealand v Sri Lanka

England vs Sri Lanka

New Zealand v Pakistan

References

External links
 Cricket World Cup 1983 from Cricinfo

1983 Cricket World Cup
1983 in cricket